Bobăreşti may refer to several villages in Romania:

 Bobăreşti, a village in Sohodol Commune, Alba County
 Bobăreşti, a village in Vidra Commune, Alba County